Jacqueline (Jackie) Reses is an American businesswoman, investor, author and philanthropist. She serves on the board of the Federal Reserve Bank of San Francisco and is the CEO of Post House Capital, a private investment firm.

Early life and education
Reses was born in Atlantic City, New Jersey to Ronnie and Stephen Reses. Her father owned Reses Pharmacy in nearby Margate. In 1988, she graduated early from the Peddie School in New Jersey, spending her senior year at George Washington University. She attended the Wharton School of the University of Pennsylvania where she earned a Bachelors of Science degree in economics with honors.

Career
Reses began her career at Goldman Sachs, working in the mergers and acquisitions department and later as an investor in the principal investments area between 1992 and 1999. Later she served as CEO for iBuilding, Inc., a real estate software business.

After iBuilding's sale to Realeum Software in 2001, Reses joined Apax Partners, a private equity firm with headquarters in London, England, where she ran the firm's U.S. media group. At Apax, Reses served on the boards of Cengage Learning, Intelsat, HIT Entertainment and NEP Broadcasting.

In 2012, Reses joined Yahoo! as Executive Vice President of people and development, leading hiring and HR for the company. That same year, she was appointed to the board of directors of the Alibaba Group, where she helped lead Alibaba's IPO in September 2014. As Chief Development Officer at Yahoo!, Reses lead forty-one transactions between 2012 and 2014.

In October 2015, Reses joined Square, Inc. to head Square Capital, the company's start-up small-business lending program and was appointed as the Chief Human Resources Officer.

In 2022, Reses co-authored the book Self-Made Boss with Lauren Weinberg.

Boards
Reses served on the Board of Trustees and Investment Committee for Peddie School and the Investment Committee for Brearley School in New York. She has also served on the boards of Good+Foundation (formerly Baby Buggy), Citymeals-on-Wheels, and Springboard Enterprises, a non-profit networking platform for businesswomen. Reses has been on the board of the Wharton School since 2015.

Reses has served on the Economic Advisory Council of the Federal Reserve Bank of San Francisco since 2015. In July 2020, she joined the board of Pershing Square Tontine Holdings, a special-purpose acquisition company.

As of 2021, Reses served on the boards of Nubank, Affirm Holdings, and entertainment company Endeavor.

Personal life

Reses lives with her husband, Matthew Apfel, and their three children in Woodside, California.

References 

executives
Federal Reserve Bank people
Living people
Peddie School alumni
People from Atlantic City, New Jersey
Wharton School of the University of Pennsylvania alumni
Women corporate directors
Year of birth missing (living people)
21st-century American women